St. Lazar's Church in Maribor, a town in northeastern Slovenia, was built during the time of the Kingdom of Yugoslavia on the former Jugoslavia Square (today Maister Square). It was dedicated to Saint Lazar, the Prince of Serbia (1371-1389) who was canonised as a saint after his death.

History

Construction
In 1930, the city municipality of Maribor allowed for a building of a Serbian orthodox cathedral in the park of the former Yugoslavian square. The plans for the church were drawn by the Serbian architect Momir Korunović. In 1934 a founding stone was consecrated, and in 1936 the church was built by the company "Inž. arh.  & inž. ".

Demolition 
In 1941 the church was demolished as a part of Hitler's plan of turning Maribor "once again into a German city" as the Nazi dictator declared in his speech in the occupied city. Apart from national discrimination toward the Slovene and Serbian communities in Maribor, the Nazis were also known for their hostile attitude against the Eastern Orthodox Church.

Architecture 
The first plan for the church was a slightly longitudinal ground plan with an octagonal sanctuary included in the center of the church. The octagon is an ancient architectural form common in Orthodox churches dating from the time of Eastern Roman Empire and Neo-Byzantine architecture.

According to the first plans for the church, the four domes were to be placed diagonally according to the main dome, which was however changed as they were placed frontally forming a square around the main dome. The octagon which was originally broad, was made thinner, higher, and placed on a square form. Thus a thinner form of the main dome was achieved.

References

History of Maribor
Serbian Orthodox church buildings in Slovenia
Churches completed in 1936
Destroyed churches in Slovenia
Buildings and structures demolished in 1941
Buildings and structures in Maribor